The current solar income of the Earth, or any ecoregion of the earth, is the amount of solar energy that falls on it as sunlight.  This is thought important in some branches of green economics, as the ultimate measure of renewable energy.

Buckminster Fuller first described the concept in his 1970 paper Cosmic Costing, contrasting the photosynthesis on which natural capital and sustainable infrastructural capital depend, with the chemosynthesis of extracting and using fossil fuels.

Paul Hawken is a more recent advocate of the concept, and views it as central to his notion of a restorative economy.  It remains a popular notion among those who believe that toxic waste and maintenance problems of direct solar energy devices can ultimately be overcome, or that yields of passive or biological means of gathering and using this energy as biofuels can be made to approximate those of fossil fuels.

See also
Howard Odum
Vladimir Ivanovich Vernadsky
solar constant

Buckminster Fuller
Renewable energy economy
Systems ecology
Energy economics